Matthewlabis is an extinct genus of camelid endemic to North America. Fossils have been found only in Wyoming and eastern Nebraska. It was previously named Paralabis, but this name had been previously used for a genus of earwig, so the name was changed in 2011.

References

Prehistoric camelids
Oligocene even-toed ungulates
Prehistoric mammals of North America
Prehistoric even-toed ungulate genera